Robbie D'Haese (born 25 February 1999) is a Belgian footballer who plays as a forward for K.V. Oostende.

References

External links

Living people
1999 births
Belgian footballers
Belgium youth international footballers
Association football forwards
K.V. Oostende players
Belgian Pro League players